Public Policy and Administration is a quarterly peer-reviewed academic journal that covers the field of public administration. The editors-in-chief are Alessandro Sancino (The Open University), and Edoardo Ongaro (The Open University). It was first published as PAC Bulletin in 1964 later changing its name to Public Administration Bulletin in 1971 before adopting the title Public Policy and Administration in 1986. It is currently published by SAGE Publications in association with the Joint University Council of the Applied Social Sciences Public Administration Committee (PAC).

Abstracting and indexing 
The journal is abstracted and indexed in the International Bibliography of the Social Sciences and Scopus.

See also
List of public administration journals

Editors
 Andrew Dunsire 1964-1968
 Richard A. Chapman 1968-1971
 Brian C Smith 1971-1976
 Grant Jordan and Douglas Pitt 1986-1990
 Barry O'Toole 1990-2000
 Robert Pyper 2000-2008
 Duncan McTavish and Karen Miller 2008-2015
 Claire Dunlop, Edoardo Ongaro and Keith Baker 2015-2021
 Edoardo Ongaro, Keith Baker and Alessandro Sancino 2021–2023
 Edoardo Ongaro and Alessandro Sancino 2023 - present

References

External links 
 
 UK Joint University Council Public Administration Committee

SAGE Publishing academic journals
English-language journals
Public administration journals
Quarterly journals
Publications established in 1987
Academic journals associated with learned and professional societies of the United Kingdom
Academic journals associated with learned and professional societies